F37 may refer to:

 HMS Kelvin (F37), a UK Royal Navy K-class destroyer
 HMS Jaguar (F37), a UK Royal Navy Leopard-class anti-aircraft frigate
 INS Beas (F37), an Indian Navy Brahmaputra-class frigate
 Parflange F37, a flange connection for hydraulic tubes and pipes